The Curie–Weiss law describes the magnetic susceptibility  of a ferromagnet in the paramagnetic region above the Curie point:

Below this temperature, the ferromagnet has a spontaneous magnetization. The name is given after Pierre Curie and Pierre-Ernest Weiss.

Brief summary of related concepts 

The magnetic moment of a magnet is a quantity that determines the torque it will experience in an external magnetic field. A loop of electric current, a bar magnet, an electron, a molecule, and a planet all have magnetic moments.

The magnetization or magnetic polarization of a magnetic material is the vector field that expresses the density of permanent or induced magnetic moments. The magnetic moments can originate from microscopic electric currents caused by the motion of electrons in individual atoms, or the spin of the electrons or the nuclei. Net magnetization results from the response of a material to an external magnetic field, together with any unbalanced magnetic moment that may be present even in the absence of the external magnetic field, for example, in sufficiently cold iron. The latter is called spontaneous magnetization. Other materials that share this property with iron, like Nickel and magnetite, are called ferromagnets. The threshold temperature below which a material is ferromagnetic is called the Curie temperature and varies between materials.

Limitations 

In many materials, the Curie–Weiss law fails to describe the susceptibility in the immediate vicinity of the Curie point, since it is based on a mean-field approximation. Instead, there is a critical behavior of the form

with the critical exponent . However, at temperatures  the expression of the Curie–Weiss law still holds true, but with  replaced by a temperature that is somewhat higher than the actual Curie temperature. Some authors call  the Weiss constant to distinguish it from the temperature of the actual Curie point.

Classical approaches to magnetic susceptibility and Bohr–van Leeuwen theorem 

According to the Bohr–van Leeuwen theorem, when statistical mechanics and classical mechanics are applied consistently, the thermal average of the magnetization is always zero. Magnetism cannot be explained without quantum mechanics. That means that it can not be explained without taking into account that matter consists of atoms. Next are listed some semi-classical approaches to it, using a simple atom model, as they are easy to understand and relate to even though they are not perfectly correct.

The magnetic moment of a free atom is due to the orbital angular momentum and spin of its electrons and nucleus. When the atoms are such that their shells are completely filled, they do not have any net magnetic dipole moment in the absence of an external magnetic field. When present, such a field distorts the trajectories (classical concept) of the electrons so that the applied field could be opposed as predicted by the Lenz's law. In other words, the net magnetic dipole induced by the external field is in the opposite direction, and such materials are repelled by it. These are called diamagnetic materials.

Sometimes an atom has a net magnetic dipole moment even in the absence of an external magnetic field. The contributions of the individual electrons and nucleus to the total angular momentum do not cancel each other. This happens when the shells of the atoms are not fully filled up (Hund's Rule). A collection of such atoms however, may not have any net magnetic moment as these dipoles are not aligned. An external magnetic field may serve to align them to some extent and develop a net magnetic moment per volume. Such alignment is temperature dependent as thermal agitation acts to disorient the dipoles. Such materials are called paramagnetic.

In some materials, the atoms (with net magnetic dipole moments) can interact with each other to align themselves even in the absence of any external magnetic field when the thermal agitation is low enough. Alignment could be parallel (ferromagnetism) or anti-parallel. In the case of anti-parallel, the dipole moments may or may not cancel each other (antiferromagnetism, ferrimagnetism).

Density matrix approach to magnetic susceptibility 

We take a very simple situation in which each atom can be approximated as a two state system. The thermal energy is so low that the atom is in the ground state. In this ground state, the atom is assumed to have no net orbital angular momentum but only one unpaired electron to give it a spin of the half. In the presence of an external magnetic field, the ground state will split into two states having an energy difference proportional to the applied field. The spin of the unpaired electron is parallel to the field in the higher energy state and anti-parallel in the lower one.

A density matrix, is a matrix that describes a quantum system in a mixed state, a statistical ensemble of several quantum states (here several similar 2-state atoms). This should be contrasted with a single state vector that describes a quantum system in a pure state. In terms of a complete set of states, one can write
 

Von Neumann's equation tells us how the density matrix evolves with time.
 

In equilibrium,
one has , and the allowed density matrices are 
.
The canonical ensemble has 

where
.

For the 2-state system, we can write
.
Here  is the gyromagnetic ratio.
Hence , and

From which

Explanation of para and diamagnetism using perturbation theory 

In the presence of a uniform external magnetic field  along the z-direction, the Hamiltonian of the atom changes by

where  are positive real numbers which are independent of which atom we are looking at but depend on the mass and the charge of the electron.  corresponds to individual electrons of the atom.

We apply second order perturbation theory to this situation. Degeneracy of the original Hamiltonian is handled by choosing a basis which diagonalizes  in the degenerate subspaces. Let  be such a basis for the state of the atom (rather the electrons in the atom). So we get

In our case we can ignore  and higher order terms. We get

In case of diamagnetic material, the first two terms are absent as they don't have any angular momentum in their ground state. In case of paramagnetic material all the three terms contribute.

Adding spin-spin interaction in the Hamiltonian: Ising model 

So far, we have assumed that the atoms do not interact with each other. Even though this is a reasonable assumption in the case of diamagnetic and paramagnetic substances, this assumption fails in the case of ferromagnetism, where the spins of the atom try to align with each other to the extent permitted by the thermal agitation. In this case, we have to consider the Hamiltonian of the ensemble of the atom. Such a Hamiltonian will contain all the terms described above for individual atoms and terms corresponding to the interaction among the pairs of the atom. Ising model is one of the simplest approximations of such pairwise interaction.

Their interaction  is determined by their distance vector . The effect of such interaction is often approximated as a mean field and, in our case, the Weiss field.

Modification of Curie's law due to Weiss field 

The Curie-Weiss law is an adapted version of Curie's law, which for a paramagnetic material may be written in SI units as follows, assuming :

Here μ0 is the permeability of free space;  M the magnetization (magnetic moment per unit volume),  is the magnetic field, and C the material-specific Curie constant:

where  is Boltzmann's constant,  the number of magnetic atoms (or molecules) per unit volume,  the Landé g-factor,  the Bohr magneton,   the angular momentum quantum number.

For the Curie-Weiss Law the total magnetic field is  where  is the Weiss molecular field constant and then

which can be rearranged to get

which is the Curie-Weiss Law

where the Curie temperature  is

See also
Curie's law
Paramagnetism
Pierre Curie
Pierre-Ernest Weiss
Exchange interaction

Notes

References

http://theory.tifr.res.in/~sgupta/courses/qm2013/hand5.pdf

External links
 Magnetism: Models and Mechanisms in E.  Pavarini, E. Koch, and U. Schollwöck: Emergent Phenomena in Correlated Matter, Jülich 2013, 

Magnetic ordering
Pierre Curie